Skit i allt is the sixth album by the Swedish psychedelic rock group Dungen. The title literally means "Screw it all" in Swedish.

It was released as a CD and a limited edition red vinyl (1,200 copies only) on August 30, 2010, by Subliminal Sounds in Sweden. The album was released in the US on the Mexican Summer imprint of Kemado Records on September 14, 2010.

Track listing
All tracks by Gustav Ejstes.
"Vara snabb" ("Being fast") - 3:09
"Min enda vän" ("My only friend") - 3:15
"Brallor" ("Pants") - 3:14
"Soda" - 3:38
"Högdalstoppen" - 4:43
"Skit i allt" ("Screw it all") - 2:59
"Barnen undrar" ("The children are wondering") - 3:21
"Blandband" ("Mixtape") - 3:49
"Nästa sommar" ("Next summer") - 3:19
"Marken låg stilla" ("The ground lay still") - 2:54

Personnel 
Gustav Ejstes – flute, guitar, piano, strings, zither, vocals, bass guitar on 2 and 8, drums on 2, producer, engineer
Reine Fiske – bass guitar, guitar
Mattias Gustafsson – bass guitar on 5 and 9
Johan Holmegard – drums
Anna Järvinen – vocals on 3
Magnus Josefsson - recording assistant
Stefan Kéry – executive producer
Jenny Palén - cover design, photos
Håkan Åkesson – mastering
Nicole Atkins, Mattias Gustafsson, Stefan Kéry, Chris Newmyer and Love Palén Åkerlund – additional photos

References

2010 albums
Dungen albums